The Leinster Senior League, inaugurated in 1971-72, is a rugby union competition for senior clubs in the Irish province of Leinster. It has traditionally been ranked second in importance to the Leinster Senior Cup. It declined in importance due to the formation of the All-Ireland League and growth in importance of the Heineken Cup and was eventually merged with the Senior Cup, sometime before 2006, before being revived in 2016.

Format
The clubs are split into two divisions, and further subdivided into groups. The eight highest-placed teams in the previous season's All-Ireland League participate in Division 1 and are split into two groups of four, who play each other once. The group winners contest the final for the league championship. The remaining senior teams play in Division 2, divided into three groups, the winners of which qualify for the Division 2 play-offs, and ultimately the Division 2 final.

List of finals
 1971-72 St. Mary's College
 1972-73 Wanderers beat Bective Rangers
 1973-74 Lansdowne beat Wanderers
 1974-75 Blackrock College beat Bective Rangers
 1975-76 Wanderers beat Blackrock College
 1976-77 Landsdowne beat Wanderers
 1977-78 St. Mary's College beat Old Wesley
 1978-79 Wanderers beat Terenure College
 1979-80 St. Mary's College beat Greystones RFC
 1980-81 Landsdowne beat Wanderers
 1981-82 Blackrock College beat Wanderers
 1982-83 Blackrock College beat Terenure College
 1983-84 Terenure College beat St. Mary's College
 1984-85 Wanderers beat Landsdowne
 1985-86 Landsdowne beat Terenure College
 1986-87 Landsdowne beat Dublin University
 1987-88 Landsdowne beat St. Mary's College
 1988-89 St. Mary's College beat Old Wesley
 1999-90 Wanderers beat Terenure College
 1990-91 Blackrock College beat Clontarf
 1991-92 Clontarf beat Old Belvedere
 1992-93 Old Belvedere
 1993-94
 1994-95
 1995-96 Terenure College beat Landsdowne
 1996-97
 1997-98 Landsdowne beat Terenure College
 1998-99 Terenure College
 1999-2000
 2000-01 Terenure College
 2001-02 Landsdowne
 2002-03
 2003-04
 2004-05
 c.2005-16 no competition (merged with Leinster Senior Cup as Leinster Senior League Cup)
 2016-17 Old Belvedere 19 - 16 Lansdowne
 2017-18 Lansdowne 9 - 0 Clontarf
 2018-19 Lansdowne 42 - 5 Terenure College
 2019-20 Terenure College 24 - 0 Old Wesley
 2020-21 not played
 2021-22 Lansdowne 34 - 13 Clontarf
 2022-23 Terenure College 17 - 15 Lansdowne

See also
 Connacht Senior League
 Munster Senior League
 Ulster Senior League

References

External links

3
1
Irish senior rugby competitions
Rugby union competitions in Leinster